U Nar Auk Monastery, also known as the U Nar Auk Shrines, is a historic Buddhist monastery located in the village of Kawhnat, Karen State, Myanmar. The monastic compound, known for its ornate blending of traditional Burmese and foreign architectural craftsmanship, contains an ordination hall built in 1895, as well as three shrines and two pagodas built between 1902 and 1904. The 28 Buddhas shrine (နှစ်ကျိပ်ရှစ်ဆူဝတ်တန်ဆောင်) is known for its arabesque archways, carved teak slab reliefs depicting the histories of Thaton and Bagan, its ceiling, and glass mosaic craftsmanship. Two of the monastery buildings, which incorporate Indo-European and Chinese motifs, were donated by Htaw Ei and Htun Kyaw, two logging tycoons.

The monastery is named after Nar Auk (my), an ethnic Mon teak logging tycoon (1832-1913).

See also
Buddhism in Myanmar

References

Buddhist temples in Myanmar
Buildings and structures in Kayin State
19th-century Buddhist temples
Religious buildings and structures completed in 1895